Snow Day is a 2000 American comedy film directed by Chris Koch, written by Will McRobb and Chris Viscardi, and produced by Paramount Pictures and Nickelodeon Movies. It stars Chris Elliott, Mark Webber, Jean Smart, and Chevy Chase with supporting roles by Schuyler Fisk, Pam Grier, Zena Grey, Josh Peck, Emmanuelle Chriqui, and David Paetkau. The film premiered on January 29, 2000, and was theatrically released on February 11, 2000. It takes place during the events of a record snow day in upstate New York, depicting various subplots including a group of kids planning to thwart a snowplow driver in an attempt to get a second snow day. This is the first of two films to star both Josh Peck and Zena Grey, the other being Max Keeble's Big Move, released the following year.

Snow Day was met with generally negative reviews but was a box office success. The soundtrack single "Another Dumb Blonde" by Hoku became the biggest chart single of Hoku's career. The film was released on home video on October 3, 2000, and re-released on DVD on September 26, 2017.

A musical remake was released on December 16, 2022 on Paramount+.

Plot
A voice-over by Hal Brandston describes how snow forms from crystallized water and how a snow day isn't just an event when schools close, but a day of magic. Despite an unusually warm season, a snow storm descends upon Syracuse, New York, leaving the Brandston family's neighborhood covered in a blanket of snow. This causes Principal Ken Weaver to become a target for children that pelt him with snowballs.

Father Tom, the local weatherman, is involved in a rivalry with Chad Symmonz, a weatherman from another station. Even though Tom predicted the previous night's snowstorm first, Chad is taking credit for the news.

His wife Laura is a workaholic, but cannot make it into work as she and youngest son Randy are severely snowed in. Stuck at home with Randy, she eventually takes her mind off work and lets loose with her son in the snow.

Meanwhile, Hal plans to spend the day trying to win over his crush Claire Bonner, the school's most popular girl who has just broken up with her loud jock boyfriend Chuck and also when Hal found Claire's sperm whale anklet in the swimming pool. His friend Lane expresses disbelief at his plan, reasoning to him that love is about finding someone you can stand to be around for more than ten minutes at a time, but she agrees to accompany him on his mission. Hal tries everything from reaching out to Claire live on his dad's news station and facing off with Chuck in a snowmobile chase.

Tom's daughter Natalie plans to use the magic of the snow day to take on her archenemy Snowplowman, a local villain who is said to run over kids and plow the streets so efficiently that there has never been a second snow day in years. With her friends Chet and Wayne, Natalie tricks Snowplowman into thinking Wayne is dead in the street. The diversion works as Snowplowman leaves the plow to investigate, and she sneaks inside the plow. Natalie's attacked by his bird Trudy, so kidnaps the violent creature. Snowplowman retaliates by grabbing Wayne. Snowplowman agrees to swap with Natalie. She will get Wayne back and a second snow day in exchange for the bird. However, Snowplowman goes back on his word following the exchange and continues on his route to plow the snow. Natalie is about to give up when she devises a plan.

Tom is able to prove Chad is a fraud when he's unable to answer basic meteorology questions on air, proving he discovered the storm first. With Chad exposed and fleeing, Tom wins back his status.

When Hal shows no signs of giving up, he ropes Lane into attracting Claire to a snow art of a sperm whale where he finds out that she actually likes zebras. After Hal dodges Chuck's group, Lane gets angry with him and admits she hasn't done what she wants to do for the snow day. When Hal asks what is it, she kisses him and leaves. He later meets up with Claire at the school's pool where she kisses him, but Hal realizes that he was wrong and he has stronger feelings for Lane. Claire encourages Hal to go after her.  

Later that night, Natalie faces off with Snowplowman alone. He taunts her, but she reveals an army of kids have united to stop him. The kids tie him to a street sign and commandeer his plow, restoring the snow onto the roads.

In search of Lane, Hal is attacked by Chuck. A fight ensues, but Hal is saved when Natalie and friends plow Chuck away into a snow bank with the plow. Hal is impressed with Natalie's accomplishment of her mission and says he wants to spend the soon-to-be second snow day with her.

Hal finds Lane at the local skating rink and apologizes to her. He repeats her line about true love being about finding someone you can stand to be around for ten minutes, and then asks her "You got ten minutes?" They kiss. The Brandstons,Lane and Claire have found new paths in their lives.

In the final scene, Principal Weaver arrives home only to be greeted by a volley of snowballs from the kids.

Cast

 Zena Grey as Natalie Brandston, a young girl out to preserve the snow day that happens to Syracuse.
 Mark Webber as Hal Brandston, the older brother of Natalie. He serves as the narrator of the film.
 Jean Smart as Laura Brandston, the mother of Natalie and Hal.
 Chevy Chase as Tom Brandston, the father of Natalie and Hal who works as a weather man.
 Chris Elliott as Roger Stubblefield / Snowplowman, a mean snowplow driver who has a reputation of eliminating snow days.
 Josh Peck as Wayne Alworth, a friend of Natalie.
 Jade Yorker as Chet Felker, a friend of Natalie.
 Schuyler Fisk as Lane Leonard, the best friend of Hal who harbors feelings for him.
 Emmanuelle Chriqui as Claire Bonner, a popular teenager and expert diver who is Hal's love interest.
 Iggy Pop as Mr. Zellweger, a boring disc jockey.
 Pam Grier as Tina
 John Schneider as Chad Symmonz, a weather man who is Tom's rival.
 Damian Young as Principal Ken Weaver, the principal of Natalie's school who becomes a target of snowballs on snow days which becomes a running gag throughout the film.
 Connor Matheus as Randy Brandston, the baby brother of Natalie and Hal.
 David Paetkau as Chuck Wheeler, Claire's on-off boyfriend. 
 Kea Wong as Paula
 Carly Pope as Fawn
 Rozonda Thomas as Mona
 Katharine Isabelle as Marla
 Tim Paleniuk as Mailman

Production
In February 1999, it was announced Nick and Paramount would team on Snow Day. The film was filmed in Cedarburg, Wisconsin, as well as Edmonton and Calgary, Alberta. Much of the outdoor snow scenes were filmed at the Bonnie Doon Park in Edmonton, which had recently had a do-over and offered a natural setting in an urban location.

The story was originally set to be based on the television series The Adventures of Pete & Pete, but the idea was scrapped and it was rewritten as a stand-alone story.

Reception

Box office
The film opened at number three at the North American box office, making 14.3 million in its first weekend, behind The Beach and Scream 3, the latter of which was on its second week at the top spot. Snow Day was a box office success, earning $60,020,107 in its domestic run, and $62,464,731 worldwide.

Critical response
Review aggregation website Rotten Tomatoes reports the film holds an approval rating of 29% based on 66 reviews, with an average score of 4.26/10. The site's critical consensus reads, "Weak assembly of characters and story lines made this movie forgettable and silly." Metacritic gives it a weighted average score of 34 out of 100, based on reviews from 22 critics, indicating "generally unfavorable reviews." Audiences polled by CinemaScore gave the film an average grade of "B−" on an A+ to F scale.

In a comparison to 1983's A Christmas Story, Roger Ebert of the Chicago Sun-Times called Snow Day "an uninspired assembly of characters and story lines that interrupt one another until the battle against Snowplow Man takes over just when we're hoping he will disappear from the movie and set free the teenage romance trapped inside it." Aside from the film itself, Ebert also wrote, "What a thoughtless place is Hollywood, and what talent it must feel free to waste", in reference to Pam Grier being given another "lousy role" after her "wonderful performance" in Jackie Brown. Entertainment Weeklys Owen Gleiberman wrote "Even Snow Days winter wonderland looks fake," and gave it an F grade.

Accolades

Soundtrack
The film's soundtrack peaked at number 183 on the Billboard 200 chart.

The following songs were included in the film but not featured on the soundtrack:

 Al Martino – "Love Letters", "Fascination" and "To Each His Own"
 Irving Berlin – "Heat Wave"
 Smash Mouth – "Satellite"
 Ernest Gold – "The Big W"
 Simon Chardiet – "Drag Blob"
 The Wiseguys – "Ooh La La"
 Schuyler Fisk – "It's Not Her"
 The Brian Setzer Orchestra – "Switchblade 327"

Musical remake

On March 1, 2022, it was announced that a remake of the film had gone into production in Montreal. Reimagined as a musical, it stars Ky Baldwin, Jerry Trainor, Laura Bell Bundy, Rob Huebel, Michaela Russell, Shelby Simmons, and Fabi Aguirre. It was released on Nickelodeon and Paramount+ on December 16 of that same year.

References

External links

 
 
 
 
 

2000 films
2000s children's comedy films
American children's comedy films
American films about revenge
Films shot in Edmonton
Nickelodeon Movies films
Paramount Pictures films
Films set in New York (state)
Films scored by Steve Bartek
2000 directorial debut films
2000 comedy films
2000s English-language films
2000s American films